The 2004 Grand Prix of Road America was the eighth round of the 2004 Bridgestone Presented the Champ Car World Series Powered by Ford season, held on August 8, 2004 at Road America in Elkhart Lake, Wisconsin.  Sébastien Bourdais won the pole and Alex Tagliani won the race, his first and only win in his Champ Car/IndyCar career.

Qualifying results

Race

Caution flags

Notes

 New Race Record Alex Tagliani 1:45:07.288
 Average Speed 110.903 mph

Championship standings after the race

Drivers' Championship standings

 Note: Only the top five positions are included.

Trivia

As of the conclusion of the 2017 IndyCar Series season, this race remains Alex Tagliani's first and only win in his Champ Car and IndyCar career.

External links
 Full Weekend Times & Results
 Friday Qualifying Results
 Saturday Qualifying Results
 Race Box Score

Road America
Grand Prix of Road America
Champ Car Grand Prix of Road America